Kenneth Andrew Attiwill  (23 September 1906 4 August 1992) was an Australian journalist, writer, playwright and scriptwriter.

Life and career
Attiwill was born at Nailsworth, Adelaide, in South Australia, in 1906, the youngest of four children. His parents were Alfred Charles Attiwill, a post-office employee, and his wife Edna Marie, née Clark. Her father, E. J. Clark, had been a newspaper editor with the Adelaide Register. Mrs Clark, Attiwill's maternal grandmother, encouraged her grandsons to become writers.

He began work in Adelaide as a cadet journalist with the Register. In 1927 he moved to Melbourne, where he was employed by the Sun and the Herald. His brother, Keith Gordon Attiwill (1899–1975) was also a journalist in Melbourne, where he became Chief of Staff at the Argus.

Attiwill left for Europe as a crewman in the Finnish sailing ship Archibald Russell in 1929. The voyage provided him with the material for his first book, Horizon (1930).

In Britain he worked for the Daily Sketch in London. Another Australian journalist working on the newspaper was Evadne Price (1888–1985), whom he married in 1939. They later became freelance writers and together co-authored a number of books and plays. They also co-wrote scripts for the British television soap opera Crossroads in the 1960s.

In World War II he served as an artillery officer in the British Army. He was a lieutenant with the 6th HAA Regiment when he captured by the Japanese in Java in 1942 and became a prisoner of war. He was presumed dead for 16 months. He and other prisoners were held at a camp at Tanjung Priok for nine months. They were then shipped to Japan on a voyage in which one in three prisoners died. On arrival he and others were put to work in a coal mine at Ube. He was liberated by Allied forces in September 1945. In 1946 he was awarded the Military Cross for gallant and distinguished services in Java.

Four of his novels and plays were made into films. These were, Non stop New York (1937), Once a Crook (1941) Headline (1943) and Not Wanted on Voyage (1957). He and his wife also appeared as actors in the film Trouble with Junia (1967).

Attiwill and his wife returned to Australia in 1976. He died in Sydney on 4 August 1992, aged 85 years. He is buried in the Northern Suburbs Memorial Park and Crematorium, Sydney.

Select bibliography
 Horizon (1930)
 Steward (1932)
 Reporter! (1933)
 Two Minutes (1934)
 Big Ben (1936)
 Sky Steward (1936)
 Once a crook; A play in a prologue and three acts (1943)
 The rising sunset (1957)
 The Singapore story (1959)

References

Sources
 H.M. Green (1985, revised and edited by Dorothy Green), History of Australian literature, Sydney, Angus & Robertson, p. 1403. 
 E. Morris Miller & Frederick T. Macartney, Australian Literature, Angus and Robertson, Sydney, 1956, p. 43.
 William H. Wilde, Oxford companion to Australian literature, OUP, Melbourne, 1986, p. 43.
 “Ken Attiwill,” Austlit.edu.au

20th-century Australian journalists
20th-century Australian male writers
Military personnel from South Australia
British Army personnel of World War II
Australian male dramatists and playwrights
British World War II prisoners of war
Australian recipients of the Military Cross
Australian expatriates in England
Maritime writers
Royal Artillery officers
Australian prisoners of war
1906 births
1992 deaths
World War II prisoners of war held by Japan
The Argus (Melbourne) people